James H. Fowler (born February 18, 1970) is an American social scientist specializing in social networks, cooperation, political participation, and genopolitics (the study of the genetic basis of political behavior). He is currently Professor of Medical Genetics in the School of Medicine and Professor of Political Science in the Division of Social Science at the University of California, San Diego.  He was named a 2010 Fellow of the John Simon Guggenheim Foundation.

Background
Fowler earned a bachelor's degree from Harvard College in 1992, a master's degree in International Relations from Yale University in 1997, and a Ph.D. in Government from the Harvard University in 2003.  He was also a Peace Corps volunteer in Ecuador from 1992 to 1994. In 2010, he was named by Foreign Policy magazine to its list of top global thinkers.

Research
Fowler's research centers on social networks. He is best known for his studies of the social spread of obesity, smoking, and happiness in the Framingham Heart Study, but he has also studied the network of legislative cosponsorships in the U.S. Congress and the network of U.S. Supreme Court precedents.

Studies by Nicholas A. Christakis and Fowler suggested a variety of individuals' attributes like obesity, smoking cessation, and happiness rather than being individualistic, are causally correlated by contagion mechanisms that transmit these behaviors over long distances within social networks. A debate over the statistical models used to establish these three degrees of influence findings ensued, but subsequent studies have found evidence of their central claims about behavioral influence and contagion.

In addition to his research on social networks, Fowler has become known for his work on genopolitics, showing that genes influence voting and other forms of political participation.  Fowler used twin studies of voter turnout in Los Angeles and the National Longitudinal Study of Adolescent Health to establish that the decision to vote in the United States has very strong heritability.  He has also identified three genes that are associated with voter turnout and partisan attachment, specifically those regulating the serotonin and dopamine systems in the brain via the production of monoamine oxidase, 5HTT, and DRD2.

More recently, he has shown evidence that social networks have a partly genetic basis.  In 2010, he published a paper regarding the use of social networks as 'sensors' for forecasting epidemics.

In other research, Fowler is known for his theoretical and experimental work on egalitarianism and the evolution of cooperation, with related work on altruism, overconfidence, and political participation.

Fowler's newest research focuses on Facebook friendship as a predictor of voter mobilization, and the use of the social network medium, to mobilize voters in American elections. Based on a large manipulation of friendship cues in the Facebook social network, Fowler demonstrates that being presented with indications of friends having voted is a strong predictor of individual voting.

Books
In September 2009, Little, Brown & Co. published Connected: The Surprising Power of Our Social Networks and How They Shape Our Lives by Nicholas A. Christakis and James H. Fowler. Connected draws on previously published and unpublished studies, including the Framingham Heart Study and makes several new conclusions about the influence of social networks on human health and behavior. In Connected, they put forward their "three degrees of influence" rule about human behavior, which theorizes that each person's individual social influence stretches three degrees before it fades out.

The Colbert Report
On February 28, 2008, the Los Angeles Times published an op-ed that summarized Fowler's research showing that Democratic candidates who come on The Colbert Report receive 44% more in campaign donations in the first 30 days after appearing on the show. Colbert pointed out the op-ed on his March 3, 2008 show.  Fowler also appeared during the Threatdown on his December 10, 2008 show, describing his work on the spread of happiness in social networks, and again on the January 7th, 2010 show to discuss the sociological impact of social networking.

Selected publications

The Framingham Heart Study Social Network

Genes and Politics

Genes and Social Networks

Experimental Studies of Cooperation and Egalitarianism

Evolutionary Models

Altruism and Political Participation

Legislator Social Networks

Voter Social Networks

Network of Supreme Court Precedents

References

External links
 Personal webpage for James Fowler
 SSRN page with papers by James Fowler
 Center for Wireless and Population Health Systems
 UCSD Political Science Department faculty
 
 Video interview in Conversation with Tom Munnecke January 7, 2009
 Peace Corps Wiki article http://www.peacecorpswiki.org/James_Fowler
 Website for Connected: The Surprising Power of Our Social Networks and How They Shape Our Lives http://connectedthebook.com

1970 births
Living people
American political scientists
Harvard College alumni
Yale University alumni
Peace Corps volunteers